The Apollo Club of Boston, founded in 1871, is the second-oldest continuously active men’s singing group in the United States.

Before the advent of radio, the club was a major source of entertainment for well-to-do Bostonians. In 1874, the Apollo Club sang at the funeral services of Massachusetts Senator Charles Sumner and received a note of appreciation from Henry Wadsworth Longfellow. In 1901, the club sang at President William McKinley's memorial service at Faneuil Hall. And in 1924, when the George Francis Parkman Memorial Bandstand was dedicated on the Boston Common, 79 Apollo members sang to the accompaniment of the Boston Municipal Band. In the 1940s, the club had a regular radio show. In 2009 the club performed at the Boston Public Library in conjunction with an exhibit on the club's history.

Today, the club has approximately 25 members and performs a varied repertoire of show tunes, sea chanties, patriotic,  love and folk songs at venues around the Boston area. The club is directed by Steven Lipsitt, former leader of the Yale Russian Chorus and Pitchpipe of the Whiffenpoofs. He currently also serves as music director of the Boston Classical Orchestra. The club is accompanied by Rob Humphreville.

External links
Apollo Club of Boston, official site

Choirs in Massachusetts
Musical groups established in 1871
Musical groups from Boston
1871 establishments in Massachusetts